Duddon is a former civil parish, now in the parish of Duddon and Burton, in Cheshire West and Chester, England.  It contains 13 buildings that are recorded in the National Heritage List for England as designated listed buildings, all of which are at Grade II.  This grade is the lowest of the three gradings given to listed buildings and is applied to "buildings of national importance and special interest".  Apart from the village of Duddon, the parish is entirely rural.  All the listed buildings are houses, or are related to farming.

See also
Listed buildings in Clotton Hoofield
Listed buildings in Huxley
Listed buildings in Foulk Stapleford
Listed buildings in Willington
Listed buildings in Tarvin

References
Citations

Sources

Listed buildings in Cheshire West and Chester
Lists of listed buildings in Cheshire